The 2017 Rugby Europe Women's Sevens Grand Prix Series was the top level of international women's rugby sevens competitions organised by Rugby Europe during 2017. The series featured two tournaments, one hosted in Malemort and one hosted in Kazan. Russia won both tournaments and finished as overall champions. Ireland finished third in both tournaments and finished as the series runners–up.  The series also served as a 2018 Rugby World Cup Sevens qualifier and Ireland qualified for the World Cup based on their performances in the series.  Sweden and the Netherlands were relegated to the 2018 Trophy series.

Malemort

Pool stages

Pool A

Pool B

Pool C

Knockout stage

Challenge Trophy

5th Place

Cup

Kazan

Pool stages

Pool A

Pool B

Pool C

Knockout stage

Challenge Trophy

5th Place

Cup

Final standings

See also
 2017 Rugby Europe Men's Sevens Championships
 2018 Rugby World Cup Sevens qualifying – Women

References

  
2016
Sevens
Sevens
2017 rugby sevens competitions
International women's rugby union competitions hosted by France
International women's rugby union competitions hosted by Russia
2017 in French women's sport
2017 in Russian women's sport
2017 in Russian rugby union
2017–18 in French rugby union
2016–17 in French rugby union